The Radeon RX 5000 series is a series of graphics processors developed by AMD, based on their RDNA architecture. The series is targeting the mainstream mid to high-end segment and is the successor to the Radeon RX Vega series. The launch occurred on July 7, 2019. It is manufactured using TSMC's 7 nm FinFET semiconductor fabrication process.

Architecture 

The Navi GPUs are the first AMD GPUs to use the new RDNA architecture, whose compute units have been redesigned to improve efficiency and instructions per clock (IPC). It features a multi-level cache hierarchy, which offers higher performance, lower latency, and less power consumption compared to the previous series. Navi also features an updated memory controller with GDDR6 support.

The encoding stack has changed from using Unified Video Decoder and Video Coding Engine, to using Video Core Next. VCN was previously used in the GCN 5th generation (Vega) implementation in Raven Ridge, though not utilized in other Vega product lines.

Vulkan (API) 

Vulkan 1.2 is supported with Adrenalin 20.1.2 and Linux Mesa3D 20.0.0.

Vulkan 1.3 is supported with Adrenalin 22.1.2 and Linux Mesa3D 22.0.0.

Resizable BAR support 
PCIe Resizable BAR (branded as Smart Access Memory) is supported with Adrenalin 21.9.1 or higher.

This feature (first available on RX 6000 series) is now supported on RX 5000 series GPUs.

Products

Desktop

Mobile

Workstation

Radeon Pro 5000 series 
RDNA based GPUs used inside Apple iMac (Retina 5K, 27-inch, 2020).

Radeon Pro W5000 series 
RDNA based professional class GPUs.

Radeon Pro W5000X series 
RDNA based GPUs used inside Apple Mac Pro (2019).

Mobile Workstation

Radeon Pro 5000M series 
RDNA based series of GPUs used inside Apple MacBook Pro (16-inch, 2019).

Radeon Pro W5000M series

Comparison of 5700 XT models 
Comparison of non-reference Radeon RX 5700 XT model video cards, from the AMD Radeon RX 5000 series.The dimensions of modern graphics cards frequently exceeds the dimensions specified in the PCIe standard. Particularly, no card model fits in the specified height limit of 107 mm.

Radeon RX 5000 series features 
AMD Radeon RX 5000 series features include:

 New RDNA microarchitecture
 TSMC 7nm N7 manufacturing process
 DirectX 12.0 support
 GDDR6 memory
 PCIe 4.0 support
 PCIe Resizable BAR support
 AMD MGPU support
 AMD FreeSync support
 DisplayPort 1.4a
 HDMI 2.0b
 Video Core Next 2.0

See also 
Radeon RX 6000 series
RDNA (microarchitecture)
List of AMD graphics processing units

References

External links 
 RDNA Architecture

AMD graphics cards
Computer-related introductions in 2019
Graphics processing units
Graphics cards